Óscar Ariza (born 25 September 1999) is a Venezuelan diver.

He was awarded a fellowship to the FINA Development Center and trains in Kazan, Russia. At the 2021 FINA Diving World Cup he placed 14th and met qualifications for the Olympic Games. He competed in the 10 m platform event at the 2020 Summer Olympics, coming 22nd overall.

References

1999 births
Living people
Venezuelan male divers
Olympic divers of Venezuela
Divers at the 2020 Summer Olympics
People from Valera
Competitors at the 2022 South American Games
South American Games bronze medalists for Venezuela
South American Games medalists in diving
21st-century Venezuelan people